Frank Taylor (1887 – January 1928) was an English footballer who scored 10 goals from 36 appearances in the Football League playing for Lincoln City. He played as an outside left or at centre forward. He went on to play non-league football for Worksop Town and in the Southern League for Merthyr Town.

References

1887 births
1928 deaths
Place of birth missing
English footballers
Association football forwards
Lincoln City F.C. players
Worksop Town F.C. players
Merthyr Town F.C. players
English Football League players
Southern Football League players
Place of death missing